Ľubomír Guldan (born 30 January 1983) is a Slovak former footballer who played as a defender.

Career
In August 2011, he joined Bulgaria side Ludogorets Razgrad, signing a deal for two years. On 1 July 2013, Guldan moved from Ludogorets Razgrad to Zagłębie Lubin on a two-year contract.

International career
Guldan represented the Slovakia national under-20 football team in the FIFA World Youth Championship in 2003. In May 2012, he was called up to the senior team. On 30 May 2012, Guldan earned his first cap after coming on as a second-half substitute for Marek Čech in the 0–2 loss against the Netherlands in a friendly match.

International goal

Post-career
Shortly after fis mid-season retirement, on 8 January 2021 Guldan took on a role of sporting director of Zagłębie Lubin. He held this position until 16 November 2022.

Honours

Club 
MŠK Žilina
 Corgoň Liga: 2009–10

Ludogorets
 Bulgarian A Group: 2011–12, 2012–13
 Bulgarian Cup: 2011–12
 Bulgarian Supercup: 2012

International 
Slovakia U20
2003 FIFA U-20 World Cup: Participation

References

External links
 Welt Fussball  
 
 

1983 births
Living people
Slovak footballers
Slovakia youth international footballers
Slovak Super Liga players
Swiss Super League players
First Professional Football League (Bulgaria) players
Ekstraklasa players
Association football defenders
FC Senec players
FC Thun players
MŠK Žilina players
PFC Ludogorets Razgrad players
Zagłębie Lubin players
Slovak expatriate sportspeople in Switzerland
Expatriate footballers in Switzerland
Expatriate footballers in Bulgaria
Expatriate footballers in Poland
Bulgarian expatriate sportspeople in Poland
Sportspeople from Banská Bystrica
Slovakia international footballers